Wafa Cherif (born 6 April 1986) is a Tunisian handball goalkeeper. She plays for the club A.S.F. Sfax and for the Tunisian national team.

She participated at the 2009 World Women's Handball Championship in China, where Tunisia placed 14th.

References

1986 births
Living people
Tunisian female handball players